Paština Závada is a village and municipality in Žilina District in the Žilina Region of northern Slovakia.

History
In historical records the village was first mentioned in 1402.

Geography
The municipality lies at an altitude of 380 metres and covers an area of 7.328 km². It has a population of about 257 people.

External links
https://web.archive.org/web/20080111223415/http://www.statistics.sk/mosmis/eng/run.html 

Villages and municipalities in Žilina District